is the eighth Japanese single by Angela Aki and was released on September 17, 2008. It was broadcast in a music program Minna no Uta in August 2008 with some re-runs. The song reached number three on the Oricon Weekly Charts, selling more than 200,000 copies. It was certified Million for downloads in 2016 by the RIAJ. The song is performed in the anime movie Colorful.

The song was ranked at 25 on "Billboard Japan Hot 100 Songs" chart.

The B-side "Still Fighting It" is a Japanese language cover of Ben Folds' song of the same name. Aki herself wrote the Japanese version's lyrics. Folds himself, by chance, heard Aki cover the song at the 2008 Fuji Rock Festival. He was impressed, and met with Aki. Due to this, they collaborated on the song "Black Glasses", on Aki's next album, Answer.

Choir versions
The song is the self-cover of the choir song Angela originally wrote by a request of NHK, the national public broadcaster, as the compulsory song in the 75th NHK National School Music Contest in 2008, Junior High School (12–15 years old) Division. Arranged by Hiroaki Takaha, the girls' and mixed demonstration choirs were broadcast in March 2008.

Track listing

Charts (Japan)

Cover versions 
This song has also been sung by Taiwanese singer Rene Liu under the title Strive On: To My Fifteen Year Old Self, Chinese singer Chen Ming under the title Letter, Bibi Zhou under the title Write to Future Myself, Hong Kong singer Sherman Chung under the title Letter to Myself and the 15-year-old Japanese singer and Morning Musume member Mei Yamazaki.

References

External links
Official Discography 

Angela Aki songs
2008 singles
Billboard Japan Hot 100 number-one singles
Japanese-language songs
2008 songs
Songs written by Angela Aki
Sony Music Entertainment Japan singles